110th Street is a street in the New York City borough of Manhattan.  It is commonly known as the boundary between Harlem and Central Park, along which it is known as Central Park North. In the west, between Central Park West/Frederick Douglass Boulevard and Riverside Drive, it is co-signed as Cathedral Parkway.

Route
110th Street is an eastbound street between First Avenue and Madison Avenue.  The small portion between Madison Avenue and Fifth Avenue is westbound. West of Fifth Avenue, the road widens to accommodate two-way traffic.

The Duke Ellington Memorial, a statue of Duke Ellington, stands in Duke Ellington Circle, a shallow amphitheater at 110th Street and Fifth Avenue, at the northeast corner of Central Park. Duke Ellington Circle is also the site of the future Museum for African Art.

Where 110th Street crosses Central Park West and Frederick Douglass Boulevard, at the northwest corner of Central Park, is Frederick Douglass Circle.

The south edge of Morningside Park lies along West 110th Street between Manhattan Avenue and Morningside Drive. The south edge of the Cathedral Close of St. John the Divine is located along West 110th Street between Morningside Drive and Amsterdam Avenue. The street ends at Riverside Drive before Riverside Park. The section between Frederick Douglass Circle and Riverside Drive is known as Cathedral Parkway, after the Cathedral of St. John the Divine.

Central Park North

Central Park North is a section of West 110th Street. As the name implies, it lies at the northern end of Central Park. It is bounded by Central Park West on the west and Fifth Avenue on the east. It is notable for its incongruities; the Lincoln Correctional Facility—originally constructed in 1914 for the Young Women's Hebrew Association—stands a few blocks away from new luxury condo developments.

Central Park North has three of the original gates of Central Park. Farmers Gate is located at the southern end of Lenox Avenue/Malcolm X Boulevard, while Warriors Gate is located at the southern end of Seventh Avenue/Adam Clayton Powell Jr Boulevard. Pioneers Gate is at Fifth Avenue (Duke Ellington Circle).

The original Polo Grounds was located along Central Park North, between Fifth and Sixth avenues. Originally hosting polo, it was the home for the New York Metropolitans baseball club from 1880 to 1886 and for the New York Gothams—subsequently the Giants—from 1883 to 1888.

In the first decade of the 21st century, there was significant real estate development on properties with a view of Central Park. In 2003, Manhattan-based developer Athena headed by Louis Dubin bought a property on this street. The building was pitched as "an opportunity for New Yorkers to be on the park at roughly half the price of Central Park South." The rebirth of Harlem along Central Park north had attracted celebrities such as Marcia Gay Harden, Maya Angelou, and Kareem Abdul-Jabbar. The finished building was 20 stories tall with 48 residential units, 9,500 of ground floor retail space, 48 parking spaces, and each unit had a view of Central Park.

Notable places
 Congregation Ramath Orah
 The Africa Center
 Duke Ellington Circle
 Frederick Douglass Circle
 Avalon Morningside Park
 Cathedral of St. John the Divine

Transportation
The elevated IRT Ninth Avenue Line used to reach a great height at its 110th Street station, before its demolition in 1940; it was infamous as a suicide location. Today, there are four New York City Subway stations on 110th Street:
 Cathedral Parkway–110th Street at Broadway serving the 
 Cathedral Parkway–110th Street at Central Park West serving the 
 Central Park North–110th Street at Lenox Avenue serving the 
 110th Street at Lexington Avenue serving the 

The New York Central Railroad's 110th Street station previously existed on Park Avenue, which now carries the Park Avenue main line of the Metro-North Railroad. The station opened in 1876 and closed in 1906.

West 110th Street is the southern boundary of the area where boro cabs may be hailed by passengers.

Notable people
George Gershwin lived in 501 West 110th Street, on the northwest corner of 110th and Amsterdam, where he composed his seminal piece Rhapsody in Blue. Arthur Miller lived in 45 West 110th Street as a child.

In popular culture
 The street is known from the Bobby Womack song "Across 110th Street" and from the 1972 movie of the same title (starring Yaphet Kotto and Anthony Quinn).
 The Thad Jones/Mel Lewis Big Band released a highly regarded jazz album in 1969 entitled Central Park North.
 It was the billed hometown of professional wrestling tag team Harlem Heat.
 George Gershwin wrote Rhapsody in Blue at 501 West 110th Street where he and his brother Ira lived from 1924 to 1929.

References
Note

External links
 

110
Harlem
Morningside Heights, Manhattan